James D. Peccia III is a retired United States Air Force major general who last served as the Deputy Assistant Secretary for Budget of the Office of the Assistant Secretary of the Air Force for Financial Management and Comptroller. Previously, he was the Director of Financial Management of the Air Force Materiel Command. He is the brother of Jordan Peccia, Thomas E. Golden Jr. Professor of Environmental Engineering at Yale University.

References

Living people
Place of birth missing (living people)
Recipients of the Legion of Merit
United States Air Force generals
Year of birth missing (living people)